The 1999 Conference USA men's soccer tournament was the fifth edition of the Conference USA Men's Soccer Tournament. The tournament decided the Conference USA champion and guaranteed representative into the 1999 NCAA Division I Men's Soccer Championship. The tournament was hosted by the University of Alabama at Birmingham and the games were played at West Campus Field.

Bracket

Awards
Most Valuable Midfielder:
Jeff DiMaria, Saint Louis
Most Valuable Forward:
Peter Byaruhanga, UAB
Most Valuable Defender:
Ned Crancer, UAB
Most Valuable Goalkeeper:
David Clemente, UAB

References

External links
 

Conference USA Men's Soccer Tournament
Tournament
Conference USA Men's Soccer Tournament
Conference USA Men's Soccer Tournament